Winton B. Osborne (died May 25, 1998) was an American politician and businessman from Maryland. He served in the Maryland House of Delegates, representing Harford County, from 1967 to 1970.

Early life
Winton B. Osborne grew up on a farm on Rock Spring Road in Forest Hill, Maryland. He graduated from Bel Air High School in 1946 and Baltimore Business College in 1948.

Career
Osborne established the Harford Sod and Excavating Company Inc. in 1955. The business closed in 1994.

Osborne was a Democrat. He served in the Maryland House of Delegates, representing Harford County, from 1967 to 1970. In 1972, Osborne lost his bid for a seat on the Harford County Council.

Personal life
Osborne married Rose Ella Hughes. They had four daughters, Linda Gail, Deborah Jean, Patricia Ann and Diane Cheryl.

Osborne died, at the age of 68, from drowning in Baltimore's Inner Harbor on May 25, 1998.

References

Year of birth uncertain
1998 deaths
People from Harford County, Maryland
Democratic Party members of the Maryland House of Delegates
20th-century American businesspeople
Deaths by drowning in the United States